Augusto Matte Pérez (1843 – February 25, 1913) was a Chilean politician, lawyer, diplomat, and a member of the influential Matte family. He was Minister of Finance (1877–1878, 1879–1880) and briefly Minister of Foreign Affairs (1888) of Chile.

External links
 
Reseña biográfica en el sitio de la Biblioteca del Congreso Nacional de Chile.

1843 births
1913 deaths
Augusto
Members of the Chamber of Deputies of Chile
Members of the Senate of Chile
Chilean Ministers of Finance
Chilean diplomats
Ambassadors of Chile to Germany
19th-century Chilean lawyers